The 2020–21 season was Morecambe's 97th season since formation and their 14th consecutive season in League Two, the fourth tier of English football. It ended with the club being promoted to League One for the first time in their history, following playoff wins against Tranmere Rovers and, in the final, Newport County. They also competed in the FA Cup, EFL Cup and EFL Trophy.

The season was severely disrupted by the COVID-19 pandemic, with all matches except the play-offs taking place behind closed doors.

Pre-season
Due to the late start to the season, and lack of preparation time, Morecambe's pre-season was limited to just three matches against Manchester United U23s, Workington and Everton U23s.

Competitions

EFL League Two

League table

Results summary

Results by matchday

Matches

The 2020–21 season fixtures were released on 21 August.

Play-offs

Morecambe's 4th place finish in the league saw them qualify for the play-offs for the first time in 11 years. They played 7th place Tranmere Rovers over two legs and edged the Merseysiders out 3–2 on aggregate to reach the final for the first time in their history.

Play-off Final

The semi-final victory over Tranmere saw Morecambe book their third trip to Wembley, after the 1974 FA Trophy Final and the 2007 Conference Play-off Final.

They played Welsh side Newport County for a place in League One, and prevailed thanks to a penalty from Carlos Mendes Gomes in the second period of extra time.

FA Cup

The draw for the First Round Proper was made on 26 October 2020 by Grant Holt. Morecambe were handed an away tie at eighth tier Maldon & Tiptree.

The draw for the Second Round Proper was made on 9 November 2020 by Danny Cowley, with Morecambe drawn at home to Solihull Moors of the National League.

Robbie Savage drew the teams for the Third Round Proper on 30 November 2020, with Morecambe being drawn away to Premier League giants (and eventual runners-up in the competition) Chelsea.

All draws were broadcast live on the BBC.

EFL Cup

The first round draw was made on 18 August, live on Sky Sports, by Paul Merson. The draw for both the second and third round were confirmed on September 6, live on Sky Sports by Phil Babb.

EFL Trophy

The regional group stage draw was confirmed on 18 August.

Transfers

Transfers in

Loans in

Transfers out

Footnotes

References

Morecambe
Morecambe F.C. seasons